John Lagrand may refer to:

John Lagrand (politician) (1849–?), Republican member of the Wisconsin State Assembly from Milwaukee
John Lagrand (musician) (1949–2005), Dutch musician